The Panama national football team represents Panama in men's international football and is governed by the Panamanian Football Federation. The team represents all three FIFA, CONCACAF and the regional UNCAF.

Panama qualified for the FIFA World Cup for the first time for the 2018 tournament in Russia and scored their first goal of the World Cup against England, although they lost the match 6–1. They finished bottom of their group.

Panama finished as runners-up in the 2005 Gold Cup and 2013 Gold Cup, losing to the United States on both occasions. Panama has also competed in the sub-regional Copa Centroamericana which they won in 2009, beating Costa Rica in the final (0–0 on full-time, 5–3 on penalties). They finished in third place on three occasions (1993, 2011, 2014), and finished as runners-up behind Honduras in the 2017 edition, which they hosted.

The national team is nicknamed "Los Canaleros" ("The Canal Men"), in reference to the Panama Canal.

History

Before 21st century

2011 Gold Cup 
In the 2011 Gold Cup, Panama was placed into Group C with Canada, United States, and Guadeloupe. They debuted with a 3–2 win over Guadeloupe. In the next match, they beat the United States 2–1. Then they tied 1–1 against Canada, winning their group for the first time in the Gold Cup. They played against El Salvador in the quarter-finals, beating them 5–3 on penalties. They played against the United States again, this time in the semi-finals, although they lost 1–0.

2013 Gold Cup 
In the 2013 Gold Cup, Panama began with a 2–1 win over Mexico, with Gabriel Torres scoring both goals. In the second match, Panama beat Martinique 1–0 with Gabriel Torres scoring the only goal. With two victories, they secured their qualification to the knockout stages. Already being qualified, they tied 0–0 against Canada securing the first place in their group. They easily beat Cuba 6-1 and qualified for the semi-finals with Blas Pérez and Gabriel Torres scoring two goals each. They faced Mexico again in the semifinals and beat them 2–1 to advance to the final for the second time in the competition against the United States, which was their opponent in the 2005 final and beat them on penalties. The Panamanians couldn't get their revenge on them and lost 0–1 with a goal from Brek Shea.

2014 World Cup qualifying
Panama came close to advancing out of the fourth round of qualifiers for the 2014 World Cup. In their last match, which was against the United States, they led 2–1 after 90 minutes and were assured to advance to a play-off against New Zealand, but conceded two goals in stoppage time and were eliminated, with Mexico taking the playoff slot instead.

2015 Gold Cup 
In the 2015 Gold Cup, Panama was drawn into Group A, along with the United States, Haiti, and Honduras. All of their games were a 1–1 draws. However this was enough to advanced to the knockout stage as the best ranked third place. In the Quarter-Finals, they played against Trinidad & Tobago, drawing 1-1 after 90 minutes and defeating them 6–5 on penalties. They advanced to the semi-finals against Mexico. Roman Torres scored on behalf of Panama and Andres Guardado scored for Mexico. The first 90 minutes ended in a 1–1 draw. Panama was then defeated 2–1 in extra time after referee Mark Geiger gave Mexico a penalty, which Andres Guardado also scored. With this result, Panama earned the chance to play the third place playoff against the United States. The score was 1-1 after extra time and Panama won 3–2 on penalties, giving them the third place. Mexico ended up defeating Jamaica in the final to crown themselves champions.

2018 World Cup qualifying
Four years after failing to qualify for the 2014 World Cup, Los Canaleros finally qualified for the World Cup after defeating Costa Rica 2−1 in their final qualifying match, which meant that the United States, who lost to Trinidad and Tobago 2–1, failed to qualify for the first time since 1986. Román Torres, who scored the winning goal in the 87th minute, was subsequently considered a national hero. The day after the match, the President of Panama Juan Carlos Varela declared a national holiday to commemorate the achievement, stating on his Twitter profile: "The voice of the people has been heard... Tomorrow will be a national holiday".

2018 World Cup
The national football team of Panama were drawn in Group G, together with European giants Belgium and England and the African side Tunisia. Their debut World Cup match was against Belgium, on 18 June 2018. Los Canaleros initially held on, with the score 0–0 at half-time, before eventually suffering a 3–0 loss. Six days later, Panama faced England, and this time succumbed to a 6–1 defeat; Felipe Baloy's late goal was the nation's first at a World Cup, but it was not enough to save them from elimination. A 2–1 loss to Tunisia in their final game meant that Panama finished bottom of their group - and 32nd and last in the tournament overall - having lost all three of their games and conceded eleven goals.

Results and fixtures

The following is a list of match results in the last 12 months, as well as any future matches that have been scheduled.

2022

2023

Coaching staff

Managers 
Caretaker managers are listed in italics.

 Romeo Parravicini (1938)
 Manuel Sánchez Durán (1941)
 Emel Ospino (1946)
 Óscar Rendoll Gómez (1946, 1951)
 Óscar Suman Carrillo (1949)
 Gilberto Casanova (1950)
 Moses Stern (1950)
 Rogelio Díaz (1952)
 Emel Ospino (1956)
 José Bech Casablanca (1961, 1967)
 Raúl "Che" Álvarez (1963–64)
 Luis Carlos Ponce (1967)
 Néstor Valdez Moraga (1969)
 Renato Panay (1976)
 Omar Muraco (1978)
 Edgardo Bone Baldi (1979)
 Luis Borghini (1980)
 Rubén Cárdenas (1980)
 Orlando Muñoz (1984, 1995)
 Carlos Cavagnaro (1984)
 Juan Colecchio (1986–1987)
 Miguel Mansilla (1987–1988, 1990, 1999–2000)
 Gustavo de Simone (1992)
 César Maturana (1995–96)
 Óscar Aristizábal (1999)
 Ezequiel Fernandez (2000)
 Leopoldo Lee (2000)
 Mihai Stoichiță (2001)
 Billy Stenning (2001–02)
 Carlos Alberto da Luz (2002–03)
 José Eugenio Hernández (2004–05)
 Julio Dely Valdés (2006)
 Víctor René Mendieta (2006)
 Alexandre Guimarães (2006–08)
 Gary Stempel (2008–09)
 Julio Dely Valdés (2010–13, 2019)
 Hernán Darío Gómez (2014–2018)
 Gary Stempel (2018–2019)
 Américo Gallego (2019–2020)
 Thomas Christiansen (2020–present)

Players

Current squads

Against Argentina
The following players were called up for the friendly match against Argentina  on 23 March 2023.

Caps and goals correct as of 12 June 2022, after the match against Martinique.

Against Costa Rica
The following players were called up for the 2022–23 CONCACAF Nations League A match against Costa Rica on 28 March 2023.

Caps and goals correct as of 12 June 2022, after the match against Martinique.

Recent call-ups
The following players have been called up within the past year.

INJ Withdrew due to injury.
COV Withdrew due to COVID-19
PRE Preliminary squad.
RET Retired from the national team.
SUS Serving Suspension.
WD Withdrew for personal reasons.

Player records

Players in bold are still active with Panama.

Most capped players

Top goalscorers

Competitive record

FIFA World Cup

CONCACAF Gold Cup

CONCACAF Nations League

Copa América

1 Ecuador 1993 was the first time nations from outside the CONMEBOL were invited.
2 United States 2016 was the first time nations from outside the CONMEBOL could qualify and host.

Copa Centroamericana

CCCF Championship

Head-to-head results
Updated as for 12 March 2023.

Honours

CONCACAF Championship / Gold Cup
 Silver: 2005, 2013
 Bronze: 2011, 2015

Copa Centroamericana
 Champions: 2009
 Silver: 2007, 2017
 Bronze: 1993, 2011, 2014

CCCF Championship
 Champions: 1951
 Bronze: 1948

FIFA World Ranking

Last update was on 24 December 2022.
Source:

 Best Ranking   Worst Ranking   Best Mover   Worst Mover'''

See also

 Panama national under-20 football team
 Panama national under-17 football team
 Football in Panama

References

External links

  
 Panama FIFA profile

 
Central American national association football teams